A granule is a clast of rock with a particle size of 2 to 4 millimetres based on the Krumbein phi scale of sedimentology. Granules are generally considered to be larger than sand (0.0625 to 2 millimetres diameter) and smaller than pebbles (4 to 64 millimetres diameter). A rock made predominantly of granules is termed a granule conglomerate.

See also
Gravel
Particle size (grain size)

References

Stone (material)
Sedimentology
Granularity of materials